Peritornenta gennaea is a moth in the family Depressariidae. It was described by Edward Meyrick in 1923. It is found in Fiji.

Characteristics

The wingspan is about 15 mm.

The forewings are whitish, closely irrorated grey, and with scattered small black dots (especially a subcostal and subdorsal series posteriorly, and on the veins towards the termen). The veins are white-lined near the termen, but may also possess a short streak of pinkish suffusion on the fold beneath the middle of the wing, as well as a subcrescentic black-ish mark on the end of the cell. Beyond this a cloudy blotch of darker grey irroration (suffused and pink-ish). There may also be a suffused darker grey semi-oval blotch on the costa somewhat beyond the middle and a curved-angulated whitish shade at three-fourths, followed by some darker grey suffusion with a slight pinkish tinge. The hindwings are grey.

References

Moths described in 1923
Peritornenta